In cooking and gastronomy, goose is the meat of several species of bird in the family Anatidae. The goose is in the biological family of birds including ducks, and swans, known as the family of Anatidae. The family has a cosmopolitan distribution. Roast goose is a dish found in Chinese, European, and Middle Eastern cuisines. In Chinese cuisine, geese and ducks can be steamed with aromatics. Goose and goose liver are also used to make foie gras, pates and other forms of forcemeat. Most Chinese preparations of goose involve cooking it thoroughly, while in France the breast meat is often carved off to be grilled rare (as with duck), while the rest of the tough carcass is further roasted.

Southern China

In southern China, roast goose is a variety of siu mei, or roasted meat dishes, within Cantonese cuisine. It is made by roasting geese with seasoning often in a charcoal furnace at high temperature. Roasted geese of high quality have crisp skin with juicy and tender meat. Slices of roast goose may be served with plum sauce.

Hong Kong 
Roast goose, as served in Hong Kong,
 is similar  to its counterpart in the neighboring Guangdong Province of southern China. Some restaurants offer a similarly prepared roast duck.

European

Goose has a distinct flavor which makes it a favorite European Christmas dish. In Germany, roast goose is a staple for Christmas Day meals. For European cultures, roast goose is traditionally eaten only on appointed holidays, including St. Martin's Day.

It is generally replaced by the turkey in the United States. Similarly, goose is often an alternative to turkey on European Christmas tables.
In the United States, the price per pound of goose is usually similar to that of farmed duck, but the large size of the bird and low yield of meat to bone and fat makes a goose a luxury item for most. An added value is that roasting a goose will render a great deal of excellent quality fat which is typically used for roasting potatoes or as the shortening in pie crust (sweet or savory). One can also simmer pieces of goose submerged in the fat to make confit.
Roast goose is also a popular ingredient for post-Christmas meals. There are a number of recipes for Boxing Day which make use of left over roast goose from one's Christmas Day banquet.

Variations
Prevalent stuffings are apples, sweet chestnuts, prunes and onions. Typical seasonings include salt and pepper, mugwort, or marjoram. Also used are red cabbage, Klöße, and gravy, which are used to garnish the goose.

Middle East

Goose meat has been consumed as a delicacy in many parts of the world, including the Middle East, for centuries. The Middle Eastern cuisine is known for its unique and rich flavors, and goose meat is a prime example of that.

In the Middle East, goose meat is commonly prepared during the winter months when it is at its best. The meat is highly nutritious, rich in protein and iron, and has a distinct flavor that sets it apart from other types of poultry.

One of the most popular dishes in the Middle East that features goose meat is "Feseekh." This dish is a traditional Egyptian dish that is usually served during Sham el-Nessim, a spring holiday that dates back to the time of the Pharaohs. Feseekh is made by salting and fermenting the fish, and then serving it with pita bread and onions. Goose meat is often added to the dish to enhance its flavor and nutrition value.

Another popular Middle Eastern dish that features goose meat is "Mansaf." This is a traditional Jordanian dish that is often served during weddings and other celebrations. Mansaf is made with tender pieces of lamb or goat meat that are cooked with spices, served on top of a bed of rice, and topped with a yogurt sauce. Goose meat is sometimes used as a substitute for lamb or goat meat in this dish, and it adds a unique flavor to the dish.

In Iran, goose meat is often used in a dish called "Ghimeh." This dish is made with yellow split peas, diced potatoes, and meat that is cooked in a tomato sauce. Goose meat is sometimes used in place of beef or lamb, and it adds a distinct flavor to the dish.

Overall, goose meat is a popular and nutritious food in the Middle East. Its unique flavor and versatility make it a staple ingredient in many traditional Middle Eastern dishes. If you ever have the chance to try a Middle Eastern dish that features goose meat, do not hesitate to give it a try!

Among the most famous food products special to Kars region of Turkey are Kars honey, Kars Kasseri, Kars Gruyère cheese, which tastes like Swiss Emmental cheese, and Kars style roast goose.

Gallery

See also

 Siu mei
 Char siu
 List of Christmas dishes

References

External links
 Gordon's Christmas roast goose recipe Retrieved 26 April 2013
 The Perfect Christmas Goose Recipe Retrieved 26 April 2013

Chinese cuisine
Hong Kong cuisine
Estonian cuisine
German cuisine
Turkish cuisine
Israeli cuisine
Middle Eastern cuisine
European cuisine
Poultry dishes
Christmas in Germany
Christmas food